Ernest S. Brown (September 25, 1903July 23, 1965) served briefly as a United States senator from Nevada in 1954.

Ernest Brown, born in Alturas, California, moved with his family to Reno, Nevada, in 1906, where he later attended the public schools. He graduated from the University of Nevada at Reno in 1926.  Brown gained admission to the bar in 1927 and then commenced a legal practice in Reno. He served in the Nevada State Assembly in 1933.  From 1935 to 1941, Brown worked as district attorney of Washoe County.  He resigned from office in 1941 to enter active service in the United States Army as a second lieutenant. He gained a commission as a colonel, and the Army discharged him in 1945.  Brown returned to his Reno home to resume the practice of law.

On October 1, 1954, Nevada Governor Charles H. Russell appointed Ernest Brown to the U.S. Senate as a Republican to fill the vacancy caused by the death of veteran Senator Pat McCarran. Democrat Alan Bible defeated him in a special election to keep his Senate seat in November 1954.  Bible assumed the seat on December 1, 1954, and Brown once again resumed the practice of law.

Brown died in Reno in 1965, and was interred in the Masonic section of Mountain View Cemetery.

References

1903 births
1965 deaths
20th-century American politicians
District attorneys in Nevada
Republican Party members of the Nevada Assembly
Military personnel from Nevada
Nevada lawyers
People from Alturas, California
Politicians from Reno, Nevada
Republican Party United States senators from Nevada
United States Army colonels
University of Nevada, Reno alumni
20th-century American lawyers
Military personnel from California